Turbonilla riisei is a species of sea snail, a marine gastropod mollusk in the family Pyramidellidae, the pyrams and their allies.

Distribution
This species occurs in the following locations:
 Caribbean Sea
 Cayman Islands
 Cuba
 Gulf of Mexico
 Lesser Antilles

References

External links
 To Encyclopedia of Life
 To ITIS
 To World Register of Marine Species

riisei
Gastropods described in 1875